WWZD-FM (106.7 MHz, "Wizard 106.7") is a country music formatted radio station based in New Albany, Mississippi, and serving Tupelo and Northeast Mississippi with an ERP of 28,000 watts. WWZD is owned by iHeartMedia, Inc., through licensee iHM Licenses, LLC.

External links
 

Country radio stations in the United States
WZD
IHeartMedia radio stations